

A 
 Absurdism
 Academic skepticism
 Achintya Bheda Abheda
 Advaita Vedanta
 Agnosticism
 Ajātivāda
 Ājīvika
 Ajñana
 Alexandrian school
 Analytic philosophy
 Analytical Thomism
 Anarchist schools of thought
 Antipositivism
 Antireductionism
 Aristotelianism
 Atheism
 Atomism
 Augustinianism
 Australian realism
 Averroism
 Avicennism

B 
 Brahmoism
 British idealism
 Budapest School
 Buddhism

C 
 Cambridge Platonists
 Carolingian Renaissance
 Cartesianism
 Charvaka
 Christian humanism
 Christian philosophy
 Classical Marxism
 Collegium Conimbricense
 Communitarianism
 Confucianism
 Continental philosophy
 Critical realism (philosophy of perception)
Critical realism (philosophy of the social sciences)
 Cynicism
 Cyrenaics

D 
 Deconstruction
 Deism
 Deontological ethics
 Dialectical materialism
 Dvaita Vedanta
 Dvaitadvaita

E 
 Egoism
 Eleatics
 Eliminativism
 Emanationism
 Emergentism
 Empiricism
 Epicureanism
 Eretrian school
 Essentialism
 Existentialism
 Externism

F 
 Feminist philosophy
 Fictionalism
 Fideism

 Frankfurt School

G 
 Gaudiya Vaishnavism
 German idealism

H 
 Haskalah
 Hedonism
 Historicism
 Huang–Lao
 Holism
 Humanism

I 
 Idealism
 Illuminationism
 Innatism
 Intellectualism
 Intuitionism
 Ionian School
 Islamic philosophy

J 
 Jainism

K 
 Kantianism

 Kyoto School

L 
 Legal positivism
 Legal realism
 Legalism (Chinese philosophy)
 Liberalism
 Libertarianism
 Libertinism
 Lwów–Warsaw school

M 
 Madhyamaka
 Marburg School
 Marxist humanism
 Marxism
 Marxism–Leninism
 Marxism–Leninism–Maoism
 Materialism
 Megarian school
 Mohism
 Molinism

N 
 Naturalism
 Neohumanism
 Neoromanticism
 Neo-Kantianism
 Neo-Marxism
 Neoplatonism
 Neopositivism
 Neopragmatism
 Neopythagoreanism
 Neo-Scholasticism
 Neostoicism
 Neo Vedanta
 Nichiren Buddhism
 Nihilism
 Nominalism
 Nyaya School

O 
 Objectivism
 Occamism
 Oxford Calculators
 Oxford Franciscan school

P 
 Perennial philosophy
 Peripatetic school
 Personalism
 Phenomenology
 Physicalism
 Platonic epistemology
 Platonic idealism
 Platonic realism
 Platonism
 Pluralist school
 Port-Royal schools
 Positivism
 Postmodernism
 Pragmatism
 Praxis school
 Pre-Socratic philosophy
 Process philosophy
 Pyrrhonism
 Pythagoreanism
 Post-structuralism

Q 
 Quietism

R 
 Radical behaviorism
 Rationalism
 Realism
 Reductionism
 Reformational philosophy
 Romanticism
 Russian cosmism

S 
 Sarvastivada
 Satanism
 Sautrantika
 Scholasticism
 School of Names
 School of Salamanca
 School of the Sextii
 Scotism
 Scottish common sense realism
 Secularism
 Shuddhadvaita
 Shaykhism
 Skepticism
 Social liberalism 
 Solipsism
 Sophists
 Speculative realism
 Stoicism
 Structuralism
 Sufi philosophy

T 
 Taoism
 Theism
 Theosophy
 Thomism
 Traditionalist School
 Transcendental idealism
 Transcendentalism (New England)
 Transhumanism

U 
 Utilitarianism
 Utopian socialism

V 
 Vaibhashika
 Vedanta
 Vienna Circle
 Virtue ethics
 Vishishtadvaita
 Vitalism
 Voluntarism
 Voluntaryism
 Vivartavada

Y 
 Yogachara
 Young Hegelians

 
Schools of philosophy
Philosophical theories